Extended Vector Animation (EVA) is a web-based vector graphic file format developed by Sharp Corporation in 1996. The EVA format differs from other vector formats because only the changes in vectors over time is recorded, instead of information per frame. The format is popular in Japan and several versions of EVA Animator software have been sold and included as standard software in Japanese Sharp notebook computers such as the Mebuis.

The EVA format is comparable with the Macromedia Flash format, except that the files are 13 times smaller than Flash counterparts. A ten-minute animation produced in the EVA format is only around 500 KB, whereas the same animation produced in Flash would be several MB in size.

Although very popular in Japan, the Animator software itself only works in Japanese versions of Windows and has never been ported to the English versions. EVA Animator has been discontinued as of January 31, 2016.

External links
Sharp EVA Animator Home (Japanese)
EVA Animator Kids version (Japanese)
Sharp Mebius Press release announcing the inclusion of EVA Animator as standard software
English Translation of EVA Animator web page

Animation software
Graphics file formats